Jetisu Taldykorgan (Jetisý Taldyqorǵan Fýtbol Klýby) is a Kazakh professional football club based at the Zhetysu stadium in Taldykorgan. They are founding members of the Kazakhstan Premier League, having missed five seasons because of relegations.

History

Names
1981 : Founded as Zhetysu
1993 : Renamed Taldykorgan
1994 : Renamed  Kainar
1998 : Renamed  Zhetysu Promservice for sponsorship reasons
1999 : Renamed  Zhetysu

Domestic history

Continental

Honours
Kazakhstan First Division
Champions (1): 2006

Current squad

Managers
 Vladimir Stepanov (2001)
 Vakhid Masudov (2004)
 Igor Svechnikov (2005)
 Ilie Carp (July 27, 2008 – Sept 26, 2008)
 Yuri Konkov (Jan 1, 2010 – Sept 5, 2010)
 Serik Abdualiyev (Jan 1, 2011 – May 10, 2012)
 Slobodan Krčmarević (June 1, 2012 – Feb 1, 2013)
 Omari Tetradze (Feb 10, 2013–23 Sep, 2014)
 Askar Kozhabergenov (Sep, 2014–20 Apr, 2015)
 Ivan Azovskiy (Apr 20, 2015 – Jan 5, 2016)
 Almas Kulshinbaev (Jan 5, 2016–)

References

External links
 Official website 

 
Football clubs in Kazakhstan
Association football clubs established in 1981
1981 establishments in the Kazakh Soviet Socialist Republic